The genetic history of Egypt reflects its geographical location at the crossroads of several major biocultural areas: North Africa, the Sahara, the Middle East, the Mediterranean and sub-Saharan Africa.

Ancient DNA 
Contamination from handling and intrusion from microbes can create issues in the recovery of ancient DNA, but new extraction methods from multiple different types of tissue have reduced contamination analysis rates  Barry Kemp (Egyptologist) has noted that DNA studies can only provide firm conclusions about the population of ancient Egypt if the sample results are of a significant number of individuals and represent a broad geographical and chronological range. DNA studies have been criticised for a range of methodological problems (e.g. insufficient sampling) and providing misleading, interpretations on racial classifications.

2012 Ramesses III
In 2012, the 20th dynasty mummies of Ramesses III and another mummy "Unknown Man E" believed to be Ramesses III's son Pentawer were analyzed by Albert Zink, Yehia Z Gad and a team of researchers under Zahi Hawass, then Secretary General of the Supreme Council of Antiquities, Egypt. Genetic kinship analyses revealed identical haplotypes in both mummies using the Whit Athey's haplogroup predictor, the Y chromosomal haplogroup E1b1a (E-M2) was predicted. E1b1a is common among Niger Congo speakers, and may have arrived to Northeast Africa through geneflow from West- and Central Africa northwards along the Nile, after the desertification of the Green Sahara.

2017 DNA study
A study published in 2017 by Schuenemann et al. extracted DNA from 151 Egyptian mummies, whose remains were recovered from Abusir el-Meleq in Middle Egypt. The samples are from the time periods: Late New Kingdom, Ptolemaic, and Roman. Complete mtDNA sequences from 90 samples as well as genome-wide data from three ancient Egyptian individuals were successfully obtained and were compared with other ancient and modern datasets. The study used 135 modern Egyptian samples. The ancient Egyptian individuals in their own dataset possessed highly similar mtDNA haplogroup profiles, and cluster together, supporting genetic continuity across the 1,300-year transect. Modern Egyptians shared this mtDNA haplogroup profile, but also carried 8% more African component. A wide range of mtDNA haplogroups were found including clades of J,U,H,HV,M,R0,R2,K,T,L,I,N,X,W. The three ancient Egyptian individuals were analysed for Y-DNA, two were assigned to West Asian haplogroup J and one to haplogroup E1b1b1 both are carried by modern Egyptians, and also common among Afroasiatic speakers in Northern Africa and the Middle East. The researchers cautioned that the examined ancient Egyptian specimens may not be representative of those of all ancient Egyptians since they were from a single archaeological site from the northern part of Egypt. The analyses revealed higher affinities with near eastern populations compared to modern Egyptians, likely due to the 8% increase in African component. However, comparative data from a contemporary population under Roman rule in Anatolia, did not reveal a closer relationship to the ancient Egyptians from the Roman period. "Genetic continuity between ancient and modern Egyptians cannot be ruled out despite this more recent sub-Saharan African influx, while continuity with modern Ethiopians is not supported".

The absolute estimates of sub-Saharan African ancestry in these three ancient Egyptian individuals ranged from 6 to 15%, and the absolute estimates of sub-Saharan African ancestry in the 135 modern Egyptian samples ranged from 14 to 21%, which show an 8% increase in African component. The age of the ancient Egyptian samples suggests that this 8% increase in African component occurred predominantly within the last 2000 years. The 135 modern Egyptian samples were: 100 from modern Egyptians taken from a study by Pagani et al., and 35 from el-Hayez Western Desert Oasis taken from a study by Kujanova et al. The 35 samples from el-Hayez Western Desert Oasis, whose population is described by the Kujanova et al. study as a mixed, relatively isolated, demographically small but autochthonous population, were already known from that study to have a relatively high sub-Saharan African component, which is more than 11% higher than the African component in the 100 modern Egyptian samples.

Verena Schuenemann and the authors of this study suggest a high level of genetic interaction with the Near East since ancient times, probably going back to Prehistoric Egypt although the oldest mummies at the site were from the New Kingdom: "Our data seem to indicate close admixture and affinity at a much earlier date, which is unsurprising given the long and complex connections between Egypt and the Middle East. These connections date back to Prehistory and occurred at a variety of scales, including overland and maritime commerce, diplomacy, immigration, invasion and deportation"

Gourdine, Anselin and Keita criticised the methodology of the Scheunemann et al. study and argued that the Sub-Saharan "genetic affinities" may be attributed to "early settlers" and "the relevant Sub-Saharan genetic markers" do not correspond with the geography of known trade routes".

In 2022, Danielle Candelora noted several limitations with the 2017 Scheunemann et al. study such as its “untested sampling methods, small sample size and problematic comparative data” which she argued had been misused to legitimise racist conceptions of Ancient Egypt with “scientific evidence”.

A follow-up study by Scheunemann et al.(2022) was carried out collecting samples from six excavation sites along the entire length of the Nile vally spanning 4000 years of Egyptian history. Samples from 17 mummies and 14 skeletal remains were collected, and high quality mitochondrial genomes were reconstructed from 10 individuals. The analyzed mitochondrial genomes matched the results from the earlier study at Abusir el-Meleq.

Later findings 
In a 2020 ancient Genome wide DNA study on ancient samples from Lebanon, two individuals who lived around 500 BCE were found to be of Egyptian origin, sharing the genetic profile of Abusir el-Meleq ancient Egyptian samples. One of them formed a clade with ancient Egyptians, which implies sharing all ancestry with them or a genetically equivalent population. The other was found to have some local Levantine ancestry (~25%). ”SFI-43 and SFI-44 clustered with the ancient Egyptians and were positioned between modern or ancient Lebanese and modern Egyptians, but SFI-44 was positioned closer than SFI-43 to the Lebanese.”

2018 Nakht-Ankh and Khnum-Nakht

The tomb of two high-status Egyptians, Nakht-Ankh and Khnum-Nakht, was discovered by Egyptian workmen directed by Sir William Flinders Petrie and Ernest Mackay in 1907. Nakht-Ankh and Khnum-Nakht lived during the 12th Dynasty (1985–1773 BCE) in Middle Egypt and were aged 20 years apart. Their tomb was completely undisturbed prior to its excavation. 
Their tomb has been called Tomb of Two Brothers because the mummies were buried adjacent to one other and inscriptions on the coffins mention the female name Khnum-Aa, who is described as 'lady of the house' and referred to as the mother of both Nakht-Ankh and Khnum-Nakht. However, the inscriptions were less informative regarding the paternal filiation. Each mummy has a different physical morphology and in the DNA analysis by the University of Manchester differences between the Y chromosome SNPs indicate different paternal lineages concluding that Nakht-Ankh and Khnum-Nakht were
half-brothers but Y chromosome sequences were not complete enough to determine paternal haplogroup. The SNP identities were consistent with mtDNA haplogroup M1a1 with 88.05–91.27% degree of confidence, thus confirming the African origins of the two individuals, based on their maternal lineage.

2018 mitochondrial DNA of Djehutynakht

In 2018 an undated mummified head of Djehutynakht was discovered in Middle Egypt at Deir el-Bersha in 1915. Djehutynakht was a governor in the Middle Kingdom Egypt of the 11th or 12th Dynasty was analyzed for mitochondrial DNA. The sequence of the mummy most closely resembles a U5a lineage from sample JK2903, a much more recent 2000-year-old skeleton from the Abusir el-Meleq site in Egypt, although no direct matches to the Djehutynakht sequence have been reported. The exact Djehutynakht's mtDNA haplogroup is U5b2b5. Related sequences have been observed in ancient DNA from Europe and Phoenicia, although without any direct matches to the Djehutynakht sequence. Haplogroup U5 is found in modern-day Berbers from the Siwa Oasis in Egypt. A 2009 study by Coudray et al., titled "The complex and diversified mitochondrial gene pool of Berber populations", recorded haplogroup U5 at 16.7% in the Siwa Oasis in Egypt, whereas haplogroup U6 is more common in other Berber populations to the west of Egypt.

2020 Tutankhamun and other mummies of the 18th Dynasty
A DNA study by Gad, Hawass et al. published in 2020, analysed mitochondrial and Y-chromosomal haplogroups from Tutankhamun's family members of the 18th Dynasty, using comprehensive control procedures to ensure quality results. They found that the Y-chromosome haplogroup of the family was R1b, which originated in Europe and which today makes up 50–90% of the genetic pool of modern western Europeans. The mitochondrial haplogroup was predominantly K, which is most likely part of a Near Eastern lineage. However, the mitochondrial haplogroup of Amenhotep III was H2b, which is associated with migrations from the Pontic-Caspian steppe to South Asia and the spread of Indo-Iranian languages. This could support the theory that Amenhotep III's mother, Mutemwiya, was a Mitanni princess and the daughter of the Mitanni king Artatama I. The Y-chromosome profiles for Tutankhamun and Amenhotep III were incomplete and the analysis produced differing probability figures despite having concordant allele results. Because the relationships of these two mummies with the KV55 mummy (identified as Akhenaten) had previously been confirmed in an earlier study, the haplogroup prediction of both mummies could be derived from the full profile of the KV55 data. The 20th Dynasty pair of Ramesses III and his son were found to have the haplogroup E1b1a, which has its highest frequencies in modern populations from West Africa and Central Africa, but which is rare among North Africans and nearly absent in East Africa.
Genetic analysis indicated the following haplogroups for the 18th Dynasty:
 Amenhotep III YDNA R1b / mtDNA H2b
 Tutankhamun YDNA R1b / mtDNA K
 Akhenaten YDNA R1b / mtDNA K
 Tiye mtDNA K
 Yuya G2a / mtDNA K
 Thuya mtDNA K

In 2010 Hawass et al. undertook detailed anthropological, radiological, and genetic studies as part of the King Tutankhamun Family Project. The objectives included attempting to determine familial relationships among 11 royal mummies of the New Kingdom, as well to research for pathological features including potential inherited disorders and infectious diseases. In 2012, Hawass et al. undertook an anthropological, forensic, radiological, and genetic study of the 20th dynasty mummies of Ramesses III and an unknown man which were found together. In 2022, S.O.Y. Keita analysed 8 Short Tandem loci (STR) data published as part of these studies by Hawass et al., using an algorithm that only has three choices: Eurasians, sub-Saharan Africans, and East Asians. Using these three options, Keita concluded that the studies showed "a majority to have an affinity with "sub-Saharan" Africans in one affinity analysis". However, Keita cautioned that this does not mean that the royal mummies “lacked other affiliations” which he argued had been obscured in typological thinking. Keita further added that different “data and algorithms might give different results” which reflects the complexity of biological heritage and the associated interpretation.

2020 Paleogenetic Study of Ancient Mummies at the Kurchatov Institute

In 2020 three mummies, dating to the 1st millennium BCE, from the Pushkin Museum of Arts collection were tested at the Kurchatov Institute of Moscow for their mitochondrial and Y-chromosomal haplogroups. Two of the mummies were found to belong to the Western European Y-chromosomal haplogroup R1b1a1b and the Southern European Y-chromosome haplogroup E1b1b1a1b2a4b5a and mtDNA haplogroups L3h1 and N5, common in Northern Africans and Middle Easterners, respectively. The third mummy was found to belong to mtDNA haplogroup N, widely distributed throughout Eurasia.

DNA studies on modern Egyptians
Genetic analysis of modern Egyptians reveals that they have paternal lineages common to other indigenous Afroasiatic-speaking populations in North Africa, West Asia, Anatolia and Horn of Africa; Some studies have proposed the view that these lineages would have spread into North Africa and Horn of Africa from Western Asia during the Neolithic Revolution and were maintained by the predynastic period.

A study by Krings et al. (1999) on mitochondrial DNA clines along the Nile Valley found that a Eurasian cline runs from Northern Egypt to Southern Sudan and a Sub-Saharan cline from Southern Sudan to Northern Egypt, derived from a sample size of 224 individuals (68 Egyptians, 80 Nubians, 76 southern Sudanese). The study also found Egypt and Nubia have low and similar amounts of divergence for both mtDNA types, which is consistent with historical evidence for long-term interactions between Egypt and Nubia. However, there are significant differences between the composition of the mtDNA gene pool of the Egyptian samples and that of the Nubians and Southern Sudanese samples. The diversity of the Eurasian mtDNA type was highest in Egypt and lowest in southern Sudan, whereas the diversity of the sub-Saharan mtDNA type was lowest in Egypt and highest in southern Sudan. The authors suggested in their conclusion that Egypt and Nubia had more genetic contact than either did with southern Sudan and that the migration from north to south was either earlier or lesser in the extent of gene flow than the migration from south to north.

A study by Luis et al. (2004) found that the male haplogroups in a sample of 147 Egyptians were E1b1b (36.1%, predominantly E-M78), J (32.0%), G (8.8%), T (8.2%), and R (7.5%). The study found that "Egypt's NRY frequency distributions appear to be much more similar to those of the Middle East than to any sub-Saharan African population, suggesting a much larger Eurasian genetic component ... The cumulative frequency of typical sub-Saharan lineages (A, B, E1b1a) is 3.4% in Egypt ... whereas the haplogroups of Eurasian origin (Groups C, D, and F–Q) account for 59% [in Egypt]." E1b1b subclades are characteristic of some Afro-Asiatic speakers and are believed to have originated in either the Middle East, North Africa, or the Horn of Africa. Cruciani et al. (2007) suggests that E-M78, E1b1b predominant subclade in Egypt, originated in Northeastern Africa (Egypt and Libya in the study), with a corridor for bidirectional migrations between northeastern and eastern Africa (at least 2 episodes between 23.9 and 17.3 ky and 18.0–5.9 ky ago), trans-Mediterranean migrations directly from northern Africa to Europe (mainly in the last 13.0 ky), and flow from northeastern Africa to western Asia between 20.0 and 6.8 ky ago. Cruciani et al. proposed that E-M35, the parent clade of E-M78, originated in Eastern Africa during the Palaeolithic and subsequently spread to Northeastern Africa, 23.9–17.3 ky ago. Cruciani et al. also state that the presence of E-M78 chromosomes in Eastern Africa can be only explained through a back migration of chromosomes that had acquired the M78 mutation in Northeast Africa.

Other studies have shown that modern Egyptians have genetic affinities primarily with populations of North Africa and the Middle East, and to a lesser extent the Horn of Africa and European populations. Another study states that "the information available on individual groups in Ethiopia and North Africa is fairly limited but sufficient to show that they are all separate from sub-Saharan Africans and that North Africans and East Africans (such as Ethiopians) are clearly separate", and concluded that most Ethiopians came from an admixture and that the larger fraction of Sub-Saharan genes came during the Neolithic times "before the beginning of the Egyptian civilisation". The study also found the gene frequency of North African populations and, to a lesser extent, East Africa to be intermediate between Africa and Europe.
In addition, some studies suggest ties with populations in the Middle East, as well as some groups in southern Europe, and a closer link to other North Africans.

A 2004 mtDNA study of 58 upper Egyptian individuals included 34 individuals from Gurna, a small settlement on the hills opposite Luxor. The 34 individuals from Gurna exhibited the haplogroups: M1 (6/34 individuals, 17.6%), H (5/34 individuals, 14.7%), L1a (4/34 individuals, 11.8%) and U (3/34 individuals, 8.8%). The M1 haplotype frequency in Gurna individuals (6/34 individuals, 17.6%) is similar to that seen in Ethiopian population (20%), along with a West Eurasian component different in haplogroup distribution in the Gurna individuals. However, the M1 haplotypes from Gurna individuals exhibited a mutation that is not present in Ethiopian population; whereas this mutation was present in non-M1 haplotype individuals from Gurna. Nile Valley Egyptians do not show the characteristics that were shown by the Gurna individuals. The results of the study suggested that the sample of Gurna individuals had retained elements of an ancestral genetic structure from an ancestral East African population, characterized by a high M1 haplogroup frequency. Another 2004 mtDNA study featured the Gurna individuals samples, and clustered them together with the Ethiopian and Yemeni groups, in between the Near Eastern and other African sample groups.

Though there has been much debate of the origins of haplogroup M1 a 2007 study had concluded that M1 has West Asia origins not a Sub Saharan African origin, although the majority of the M1a lineages found outside and inside Africa had a more recent East African origin, as a result of "the first M1 backflow [from Asia] to Africa, dated around 30,000 [years ago]". The study states that "the most ancient dispersals of M1 occurred in northwestern Africa, reaching also the Iberian Peninsula, instead of Ethiopia", and states that the evidence points to either "that the Near East was the most probable origin of the primitive M1 dispersals, West into Africa and East to Central Asia ... [with] the Sinai Peninsula as the most probable gate of entrance of this backflow to Africa" or "that M1 is an autochthonous North African clad that had its earliest spread in northwestern areas marginally reaching the Near East and beyond".

However, other authors have proposed the view that the M haplogroup developed in Africa before the 'Out of Africa' event around 50,000 years ago, and dispersed from North Africa or East Africa 10,000 to 20,000 years ago. Quintana-Murci et al. stated in reference to the M haplogroup that "Its variation and geographical distribution suggest that Asian haplogroup M separated from eastern-African haplogroup M more than 50,000 years ago. Two other variants (489C and 10873C) also support a single origin of haplogroup M in Africa".

A 2003 Y-chromosome study was performed by Lucotte on modern Egyptians, with haplotypes V, XI, and IV being most common. Haplotype V is common among all North Africans and has a low frequency outside the North African region. Haplotypes V, XI, and IV are all predominantly North African/Horn of African haplotypes, and they are far more dominant in Egyptians than in Middle Eastern or European groups. The pattern of diversity for these variants in the Egyptian Nile Valley was largely the product of population events that occurred in the late Pleistocene to mid-Holocene through the First Dynasty.

Keita (2008) examined a published Y-chromosome dataset on Afro-Asiatic populations and found that a key lineage E-M35/E-M78, sub-clade of haplogroup E, was shared between the populations in the locale of original Egyptian speakers and modern Cushitic speakers from the Horn of Africa. These lineages are present in modern Egyptians, Berbers, Cushitic speakers from the Horn of Africa, and Semitic speakers in the Near-East. He noted that variants are also found in the Aegean and Balkans, but the origin of the M35 subclade was in East Africa, and its clades were dominant in a core portion of Afro-Asiatic speaking populations which included Cushitic, Egyptian and Berber groups, in contrast Semitic speakers showed a decline in frequency going west to east in the Levantine-Syria region. Keita identified high frequencies of M35 (>50%) among Omotic populations, but stated that this derived from a small, published sample of 12. Keita also wrote that the PN2 mutation was shared by M35 and M2 lineages and this defined clade originated from East Africa. He concluded that "the genetic data give population profiles that clearly indicate males of African origin, as opposed to being of Asian or European descent" but acknowledged that the biodiversity does not indicate any specific set of skin colors or facial features as populations were subject to microevolutionary pressures.

Babiker, H et al. (2011) examined the genotypes of 15 STRs for 498 individuals from 18 Sudanese populations and featured comparative genotype data with Egypt, Somalia and the Karamoja population from Uganda. Overall, the results showed that the genotypes of individuals from northern Sudan clustered with those of Egypt, the Somali population was found to be genetically distinct and individuals from southern Sudan clustered with those from the Karamoja population. The study determined that similarity of the Nubian and Egyptian populations suggested that migration, potentially bidirectional, occurred along the Nile river Valley, which is consistent with the historical evidence for long-term interactions between Egypt and Nubia.

A study by Hollfelder et al. (2017) analyzed various populations and found that Copts and Egyptians showed low levels of genetic differentiation and lower levels of genetic diversity compared to the northeast African groups. Copts and Egyptians displayed similar levels of European/Middle Eastern ancestry (Copts were estimated to be of 69.54% ± 2.57 European ancestry, and the Egyptians of 70.65% ± 2.47 European ancestry). The study concluded that the Copts and the Egyptians have a common history linked to smaller population sizes. The behavior in the admixture analyses is consistent with shared ancestry between Copts and Egyptians and/or additional genetic drift in the Copts. An allele frequency comparative study conducted in 2020 between the two main Egyptian ethnic groups, Muslims and Christians, each group represented by a sample of 100 unrelated healthy individuals, supported the conclusion that Egyptian Muslims and Egyptian Christians genetically originate from the same ancestors.

Y-DNA haplogroups
A study by Arredi et al., which analyzed 275 samples from five populations in Algeria, Tunisia, and Egypt, as well as published data from Moroccan populations, suggested that the North African pattern of Y-chromosomal variation, including in Egypt, is largely of Neolithic origin. The study analyzed North African populations, including North Egyptians and South Egyptians, as well as samples from southern Europe, the Middle East, and sub-Saharan Africa, and revealed the following conclusions about the male-lineage variation in North Africa: "The lineages that are most prevalent in North Africa are distinct from those in the regions to the immediate north and south: Europe and sub-Saharan Africa ... two haplogroups predominate within North Africa, together making up almost two-thirds of the male lineages: E3b2 and J* (42% and 20%, respectively). E3b2 is rare outside North Africa, and is otherwise known only from Mali, Niger, and Sudan to the immediate south, and the Near East and Southern Europe at very low frequencies. Haplogroup J reaches its highest frequencies in the Middle East".

A study by Lucotte using the Y-chromosome of 274 male individuals (162 from Lower Egypt, 66 from Upper Egypt , 46 from Lower Nubia) found that the main haplotype V has higher frequency in the North than in the South, and haplotype XI has higher frequency in the South than in the North, whereas haplotype IV is found in the South (highest in Lower Nubia). The study states that haplotype IV is also characteristic of Sub-Saharan populations. Remarking on Lucotte's Y-chromosome study, which found that haplotypes V, XI, and IV are most common, Keita states that "a synthesis of evidence from archaeology, historical linguistics, texts, distribution of haplotypes outside Egypt, and some demographic considerations lends greater support to the establishment, before the Middle Kingdom, of the observed distributions of the most prevalent haplotypes V, XI, and IV. It is suggested that the pattern of diversity for these variants in the Egyptian Nile Valley was largely the product of population events that occurred in the late Pleistocene to mid-Holocene through the First Dynasty". Keita later states "Later, mid-Holocene climatic-driven migrations led to a major settlement of the valley in Upper Egypt and Nubia, but less so in Lower Egypt, by diverse Saharans with haplotypes IV, XI, and V. These people fused with the indigenous valley peoples, as did Near Easterners with VII and VIII, but perhaps also some V".

The major downstream mutations within the M35 subclade are M78 and M81. There are also other M35 lineages, e.g., M123. In Egypt, haplotypes VII and VIII are associated with the J haplogroup, which is predominant in the Near East.

Distribution of E1b1b1a (E-M78) and its subclades

Mitochondrial DNA
In 2009 Mitochondrial data was sequenced for 277 unrelated Egyptian individuals by Jessica L Saunier et al. in the journal Forensic Science International, as follows

 R0 and its subgroups (31.4%)
 L3 (12.3%); and Asian origin (n = 33)
including M (6.9%)
 T (9.4%)
 U (9.0%)
 J (7.6%)
 N (5.1%)
 K (4.7%) 
 L2 (3.6%) 
 L1 (2.5%) 
 I (3.2%) 
 W (0.7%)
 X (1.4%); African origin (n = 57) including L0 (2.2%)

Autosomal DNA 

Mohamed, T et al. (2009) in their study of nomadic Bedouins featured a comparative study with a worldwide population database and a sample size of 153 Bedouin males. Their analysis discovered that both Muslim Egyptians and Coptic Christians showed a distinct North African cluster at 65%. This is their predominant ancestral component, and unique to the geographic region of Egypt.

In a 2019 study that analyzed the autosomal make-up of 21 modern North African genomes and other populations using Ancient DNA reference populations, this sample of Egyptian genomes were found to share more affinity with Middle Eastern populations compared to other North Africans. Egyptians carry more of the Caucasus hunter gatherer / Iran Neolithic component compared to other North Africans, more of the Natufian related component and less of the Iberomaurusian related component than other North Africans, and also less of the Steppe / European hunter gatherer component. consistent with Egypt's geographical proximity to southwest Asia.

Coptic Christians
A Y DNA sample of Copts from Egypt was analyzed in Éric Crubézy et al. 2010. 
The Y -DNA profile was: 
 74% E1b1
 7% G
 3% T
 1% J1
 15% ambiguous.

An allele frequency comparative study conducted in 2020 between the two main Egyptian ethnic groups, Muslims and Christians, each group represented by a sample of 100 unrelated healthy individuals, supported the conclusion that Egyptian Muslims and Egyptian Christians genetically originate from the same ancestors.

In Sudan
According to Y-DNA analysis by Hassan et al. (2008), 45% of Copts in Sudan (of a sample of 33) carry haplogroup J1. Next most common was E1b1b, the most common haplogroup in North Africa. Both paternal lineages are common among other regional Afroasiatic-speaking populations, such as Beja, Ethiopians, and Sudanese Arabs, as well as non-Afroasiatic-speaking Nubians. E1b1b reaches its highest frequencies among North African and Horn of Africa populations such as Amazighs and Somalis.  The next most common haplogroups borne by Copts are R1b (15%), most common in Europe, and the widespread African haplogroup B (15%). According to the study, the presence of haplogroup B may also be consistent with the historical record in which southern Egypt was colonized by Nilotic populations during the early state formation.

Maternally, Hassan (2009) found that the majority of Copts in Sudan (of a sample of 29) carried descendants of the macrohaplogroup N; of these, haplogroup U6 was most frequent (28%), followed by T1 (17%). In addition, Copts carried 14% M1 and 7% L1c.

A 2015 study by Dobon et al. identified an ancestral autosomal component of West Eurasian origin that is common to many modern Afroasiatic-speaking populations in Northeast Africa. Known as the Coptic component, it peaks among Egyptian Copts who settled in Sudan over the past two centuries, they also formed a separated group in PCA, a close outlier to other Egyptians, Afroasiatic-speaking Northeast Africans and Middle East populations. The Coptic component evolved out of a main North African and Middle Eastern ancestral component that is shared by other Egyptians and also found at high frequencies among other Afroasiatic-speaking populations in Northeast Africa (~70%), who carry a Nilo-Saharan element as well. The scientists suggest that this points to a common origin for the general population of Egypt. They also associate the Coptic component with Ancient Egyptian ancestry, without the later Arabic influence that is present among other Egyptians, especially people of the Sinai.

In another 2017 study that genotyped and analyzed the same populations including Sudanese Copts and Egyptians, The ADMIXTURE analyses and the PCA displayed the genetic affinity of the Copts to the Egyptian population. Assuming few clusters, the Copts appeared admixed between Near Eastern/European populations and northeastern Sudanese and look similar in their genetic profile to the Egyptians. Assuming greater number of clusters (K≥18), the Copts formed their own separate ancestry component that was shared with Egyptians but can also be found in Arab populations. This behavior in the admixture analyses is consistent with shared ancestry between Copts and Egyptians and/or additional genetic drift in the Copts. The Egyptians and Copts showed low levels of genetic differentiation (FST = 0.00236), lower levels of genetic diversity and greater levels of RoH compared to other northeast African groups, including Arab and Middle Eastern groups that share ancestry with the Copts and Egyptians. A formal test (D(Ju|'hoansi,X;Egypt,Copt)), did not find significant admixture into the Egyptians from other tested groups (X), and the Copts and Egyptians displayed similar levels of European or Middle Eastern ancestry (Copts were estimated to be of 69.54% ± 2.57 European ancestry, and the Egyptians of 70.65% ± 2.47 European ancestry). Taken together, these results point to that the Copts and the Egyptians have a common history linked to smaller population sizes, and that Sudanese Copts have remained relatively isolated since their arrival to Sudan with only low levels of admixture with local northeastern Sudanese groups.

See also 
Genetic history of the Middle East
Demographics of Egypt
Genetic history of North Africa
Genetic studies on Arabs
Ancient Egyptian race controversy
Population history of Egypt

References 

History of Egypt by topic
History
Egypt